"Thrill of Your Love" is a song written by Stan Kesler and recorded by Elvis Presley in 1960 for his first post-army album, Elvis Is Back!. It was first recorded by Carl McVoy in 1958 under the title "A Woman's Love." His version remained unissued at the time, but has since appeared on compilation albums.

References

Elvis Presley songs
1958 songs
Song recordings produced by Stephen H. Sholes
Song recordings produced by Chet Atkins
Songs written by Stan Kesler